The Bethlehem Housing Authority is a municipal authority which provides public housing in Bethlehem, Pennsylvania.  It was founded in 1937 and the first housing projects were opened in 1941.

Properties
The Bethlehem Housing Authority oversees over 1,400 units of public housing.
Pembroke Village, including Fairmount Homes, Pfeifle Homes, and Marvine combine to include more than 750 units on Bethlehem's East Side.
Lynfield Homes is a development of 200 units on Bethlehem's South Side near the Wind Creek Bethlehem casino resort.
Parkridge is a development located on the West Side near the border with Allentown, Pennsylvania.  It includes 100 units.
Litzenberger House has 101 units and is located just north of Lehigh University.
Bodder House is a high-rise located on the West Side.
Bartholomew House is a small high-rise with 65 units.
Monocacy Tower is a high-rise located in Center City with 148 units.

See also
List of public housing developments in the United States
List of public housing authorities in Pennsylvania

External links
Official Site
Brief description

Pennsylvania law
Bethlehem, Pennsylvania
Government of Northampton County, Pennsylvania
Public housing in Pennsylvania